John Brisco Ray was an English diver who competed for England.

Diving career
Ray won a gold medal in the 3 Metres Springboard at the 1934 British Empire Games in London.

References

1902 births
1973 deaths
English male divers
Divers at the 1934 British Empire Games
Commonwealth Games medallists in diving
Commonwealth Games gold medallists for England
People from Cowfold
Medallists at the 1934 British Empire Games